The 2015–16 Vancouver Canucks season was the 46th season for the National Hockey League franchise that was established on May 22, 1970. The season began its regular games on October 7, 2015, against the Calgary Flames with a 5−1 win. On March 25, 2016, the Canucks lost 4−0 to the St. Louis Blues and were eliminated from playoff contention. The Canucks missed the playoffs for the second time in three years.

Off-season
Off-season changes began in late June at the 2015 NHL Entry Draft. Due to the Canucks having three goaltenders requiring waivers, goaltender Eddie Lack was traded to the Carolina Hurricanes (for a third-round pick at the draft and a seventh-round pick in 2016) to make room on the roster for Jacob Markstrom. This trade was disliked as fans saw the two draft picks as very little compensation for Lack. The Canucks would draft seven players at the draft. A few days later, long-time Canucks defenceman Kevin Bieksa was traded to the Anaheim Ducks in exchange for a second-round pick in 2016.

On July 1, Zack Kassian and a fifth-round pick in 2016 were traded to the Montreal Canadiens in exchange for Brandon Prust. Jim Benning continued by signing various free agents, including former Boston Bruins defenceman Matt Bartkowski and prospects Taylor Fedun and Richard Bachman, coming from the San Jose Sharks and Edmonton Oilers, respectively.

The following day, Hockey Operations Staff Laurence Gilman, Lorne Henning and Eric Crawford were released by the Canucks.

On July 28, the Canucks traded centre Nick Bonino, defenceman Adam Clendening, as well as the second-round pick acquired in the Bieksa trade, to the Pittsburgh Penguins for centre Brandon Sutter and a conditional third-round pick. One week later, the Canucks resigned Sutter to a five-year contract extension, lasting until the 2020–21 NHL season.

Training camp 
 The Canucks held their training camp at CN Centre in Prince George, British Columbia, from September 18–20.

Training camp consisted of various activities, such as power-play drills, strength and conditioning exercises, and intra-squad scrimmages.

Head coach Willie Desjardins was unable to attend training camp. Desjardins was forced to have surgery on September 8 (a mere 10 days before training camp was due to begin), due to a flare-up of a chronic hip condition. While Desjardins wanted to be in attendance, the Canucks medical staff was unable to give him clearance to head to Prince George. In his place, assistant coach Glen Gulutzan (former Dallas Stars head coach) stepped up to run the training camp. Assistant coaches Perry Pearn and Doug Lidster were also in attendance.

Many Canucks prospects and minor-league players were invited to training camp. Some, such as Nicklas Jensen, Jake Virtanen and Alexandre Grenier were fighting for roster spots on the NHL club. The preseason came to an interesting end when the Canucks placed centre Linden Vey and defensemen Alex Biega and Frank Corrado on waivers in favour of defenceman Ben Hutton and forwards Jake Virtanen and Jared McCann. Corrado was claimed by the Toronto Maple Leafs the following day. Biega and Vey cleared waivers and were sent to the Utica Comets. Both were called up in December and would finish the season with the Canucks.

Standings

Schedule and results 
The Canucks set a franchise record with a goal drought of 234 minutes and 52 seconds beginning after the Daniel Sedin goal at 12:00 of the first period on March 16 against Colorado and ending with the Bo Horvat goal at 6:52 of the first period on March 24 against Nashville.

Pre-season

Regular season

Detailed records

Player statistics

Skaters

Goaltenders

†Traded to Canucks mid-season. Stats reflect time with Canucks only.
‡Traded (or lost by waivers) to another team mid-season. Stats reflect time with Canucks only.

Suspensions and fines

Awards and honours

Awards

Milestones

Records

Transactions
The Canucks been involved in the following transactions:

Trades

Free agents acquired

Free agents lost

Claimed via waivers

Lost via waivers

Player signings

Draft picks

Below are the Vancouver Canucks' selections at the 2015 NHL Entry Draft, to be held on June 26–27, 2015, at the BB&T Center in Sunrise, Florida.

Draft notes
 The Vancouver Canucks' second-round pick went to the Calgary Flames as the result of a trade on March 2, 2015, that sent Sven Baertschi to Vancouver in exchange for this pick.
  The Carolina Hurricanes' third-round pick went to the Vancouver Canucks as the result of a trade on June 27, 2015, that sent Eddie Lack to Carolina in exchange for a 2016 seventh-round pick and this pick.
 The Vancouver Canucks' third-round pick went to the Anaheim Ducks as the result of a trade on June 27, 2014, that sent Nick Bonino, Luca Sbisa and a first and third-round pick in 2014 to Vancouver in exchange for Ryan Kesler and this pick.
  The New York Rangers' fifth-round pick went to the Vancouver Canucks as the result of a trade on March 5, 2014, that sent Raphael Diaz to New York in exchange for this pick.
 The Vancouver Canucks' seventh-round pick went to the Minnesota Wild as the result of a trade on June 28, 2014, that sent a third-round pick in 2014 to Tampa Bay in exchange for a third-round pick in 2014 and this pick. Tampa Bay previously acquired this pick as the result of a trade on June 27, 2014, that sent a second-round pick in 2014 to Vancouver in exchange for Jason Garrison, the rights to Jeff Costello and this pick.
  The San Jose Sharks' seventh-round pick (from New York Islanders via Tampa Bay Lightning) went to the Vancouver Canucks as the result of a trade on June 27, 2015, that sent Patrick McNally to San Jose in exchange for this pick.

References

Vancouver Canucks seasons
Vancouver Canucks season, 2015-16
Vancou